Elnorita Pamaran Tugung (September 20, 1939 – October 30, 2020) was a Filipino politician who served as Lupon Chairman of the nominal autonomous region of Western Mindanao (Region IX). She was also a member of the House of Representatives of the Philippines for Basilan's lone district from 1992	to 1995.

She was appointed chairman of the region in 1986 by President Corazon Aquino, after her predecessor and husband Ulbert Ulama Tugung was assassinated.

Elnorita Tugung died in 2020 due to COVID-19 during a pandemic of the disease.

References

People from Basilan
Filipino Muslims
Members of the House of Representatives of the Philippines from Basilan
Deaths from the COVID-19 pandemic in the Philippines
2020 deaths